Tudor Casapu (born 18 September 1963) is a Moldovan weightlifter, World Champion and Olympic Champion. He won a gold medal at the 1990 World Weightlifting Championships, and a gold medal at the 1992 Summer Olympics in Barcelona.

References

External links

1963 births
Living people
People from Hîncești District
Moldovan male weightlifters
Soviet male weightlifters
Olympic weightlifters of the Unified Team
Weightlifters at the 1992 Summer Olympics
Olympic gold medalists for the Unified Team
Olympic medalists in weightlifting
Medalists at the 1992 Summer Olympics